Shamini Flint (born 26 October 1969 in Kuala Lumpur, Malaysia) is an author based in Singapore.  She is best known for her crime fiction novel series Inspector Singh Investigates, published in many languages around the world.  She also writes children’s books with cultural and environmental themes.  Before becoming a writer in 2004 she was a corporate lawyer at the international law firm, Linklaters.  She is noted for her work to promote fair trade products in Singapore and donates part of her environmental book title’s proceeds to WWF.  Shamini currently lives in Singapore with her English husband Simon Flint and their two children, Sasha and Spencer Flint.

Legal career
In 1993, Shamini received the Council of Legal Education Prize for one of the highest marks overall for her Bar Finals sat at Trinity College, London.  Following which Shamini was employed by Messrs. Zain & Co and called to the Malaysian Bar.

Between 1994 and 1995 Shamini studied for her Law Masters at the University of Cambridge, UK. Whilst there she was awarded the top overall mark, the Bevan Prize, the Jennings Prize and a British High Commission Scholarship.  She was admitted as a Solicitor, Supreme Court of England and Wales in 1999.

She left Messrs Zain & Co in 1997 to join Linklaters as a Solicitor until 2002 when she became an Associate Professor of the Law Faculty, National University of Singapore.

Literary work
Shamini has published a successful series of crime fiction novels, Inspector Singh Investigates.  In April  2008, the British publishing company Little, Brown and Company bought the worldwide rights to the first three Inspector Singh Investigates novels.

The first book in the series Inspector Singh Investigates - A Most Peculiar Malaysian Murder. was honoured by The Telegraph, UK by being featured under their Recommended Weekly Special confirming the quality of the writing and a successful launch.  The seventh book in the series, Inspector Singh Investigates - A Frightfully English Execution was published in May 2016. 
In addition to Crime Fiction, Shamini also writes children’s literature of equal success, Puffin Books India have bought the sub-continent rights to Diary of a Cricket God, launched in April 2011 and Allen & Unwin have bought the rest of the world rights.

Bibliography

Crime Fiction
Inspector Singh Investigates: A Most Peculiar Malaysian Murder (April 2009, Piatkus Press; 2011, Felony & Mayhem Press)  
Inspector Singh Investigates: A Bali Conspiracy Most Foul (September 2009, Piatkus Press) 
Inspector Singh Investigates: The Singapore School of Villainy (April 2010, Piatkus Press) 
Inspector Singh Investigates: A Deadly Cambodian Crime Spree (April 2011, Piatkus Press) 
Inspector Singh Investigates: A Curious Indian Cadaver (April 5, 2012, Piatkus Press) 
Inspector Singh Investigates: A Calamitous Chinese Killing (Sept 2013, Piatkus Press) 
Inspector Singh Investigates: A Frightfully English Execution (May 2016, Piatkus Press)

Thrillers
 The Beijing Conspiracy (2019, Canongate Books)

Children's Books

Sasha in Singapore
Sasha Visits the Botanic Gardens (2003?, Sunbear Publishing) 
Sasha Visits the Zoo (2003?, Sunbear Publishing) 
Sasha Goes Shopping (2004, Sunbear Publishing) 
Sasha Visits Sentosa Island (2004, Sunbear Publishing) 
Sasha Visits the Bird Park (2005, Sunbear Publishing) 
Sasha Visits the Museums (2008, Sunbear Publishing) 
Sasha in Singapore Boxed Set

Sasha in Asia
Sasha Visits Bali (2006, Sunbear Publishing) 
Sasha Visits Kuala Lumpur (2006, Sunbear Publishing) 
Sasha Visits Hong Kong (2006, Sunbear Publishing) 
Sasha Visits Bangkok (2006, Sunbear Publishing) 
Sasha Visits Singapore (2006, Sunbear Publishing) 
Sasha in Asia Boxed Set

Sasha Sees the World
Sasha Visits Beijing (2007, Sunbear Publishing) 
Sasha Visits London (2007, Sunbear Publishing) 
Sasha Visits Mumbai (2009, Sunbear Publishing) 
Sasha Visits Tokyo (2009, Sunbear Publishing) 
Sasha Visits the Maldives (2010, Sunbear Publishing)

Sasha in Mandarin
Sasha Visits Hong Kong (Mandarin; 2009, Sunbear Publishing) 
Sasha Visits Beijing (Mandarin; 2009, Sunbear Publishing) 
Sasha Visits Singapore (Mandarin; 2009, Sunbear Publishing)

Diary Series
Diary of a Soccer Star (2010, Sunbear Publishing) 
Diary of a Cricket God (2011, Sunbear Publishing) 
Diary of a Rugby Champ (2013, Allen & Unwin) 
Diary of a Super Swimmer (2013, Sunbear Publishing) 
Diary of a Taekwondo Master (2013, Allen & Unwin) 
Diary of a Track and Field Titan (2013, Sunbear Publishing) 
Diary of a Basketball Hero (2015, Allen & Unwin) 
Diary of a Golf Pro (2015, Allen & Unwin) 
Diary of a Tennis Prodigy (2016, Allen & Unwin) 
Diary of an AFL Legend (2017, Allen & Unwin)

The Susie K Files/Diaries
Life of the Party (2018, Allen & Unwin) 
Game Changer (2018, Allen & Unwin) 
Show Stopper (2019, Allen & Unwin) 
Happy Camper (2019, Allen & Unwin)

Others
The Other Bears (Sunbear Publishing) 
Jungle Blues (2005, Sunbear Publishing) 
Turtle Takes a Trip (2006, Sunbear Publishing) 
An Elephant in the Room (2007, Sunbear Publishing) 
Partytime (2008, Sunbear Publishing) 
Panda Packs Her Bags (2008, Sunbear Publishing) 
A T-Rex Ate My Homework (2008, Sunbear Publishing) 
The Seeds of Time (2008, Sunbear Publishing) 
What Colour were the Dinosaurs? (2008, Sunbear Publishing) 
Snake Rattle & Roll (2008, Sunbear Publishing) 
Three Stars (2009, Sunbear Publishing) 
Ten (2009, Sunbear Publishing) 
Sleep Tight (2010, Sunbear Publishing) 
Spencer Visits Sydney (2013, Sunbear Publishing)

Other Titles
How to Win a Nobel Prize: A Stay-at-Home Mum's Guide (2006, Heliconia Press) 
Partners in Crime (2007, Heliconia Press) 
Criminal Minds (2008, Heliconia Press)

References

External links

 Author's website

1969 births
Crime fiction writers
People from Kuala Lumpur
Malaysian children's writers
Malaysian women children's writers
Malaysian emigrants to Singapore
Singaporean writers
Living people
Malaysian people of Indian descent
Malaysian Christians